Geraci Siculo (Sicilian: Jiraci) is a comune (municipality) in the Metropolitan City of Palermo in the Italian region Sicily, located about  southeast of Palermo.

Geraci Siculo borders the following municipalities: Castel di Lucio, Castelbuono, Gangi, Nicosia, Petralia Soprana, Petralia Sottana, San Mauro Castelverde.

References

Municipalities of the Metropolitan City of Palermo